Pussy is a term used as a noun, an adjective, and—in rare instances—a verb in the English language. It has several meanings, as slang, as euphemism, and as vulgarity. The most common as a noun, it means "cat", as well as "coward or weakling". In slang usage, it can mean "the human vulva or vagina" and less commonly, as a form of synecdoche, meaning "sexual intercourse with a woman". Because of its multiple senses including both innocent and vulgar connotations, pussy is often the subject of double entendre.

The etymology of the word is not clear. Several different senses of the word have different histories or origins. The earliest records of pussy are in the 19th century, meaning something fluffy.

Etymology 
The noun pussy meaning "cat" comes from the Modern English word puss, a conventional name or term of address for a pet cat. The Oxford English Dictionary (OED) says that cognates are common to several Germanic languages, including Dutch poes and Middle Low German pūse, which are also used to call a cat. The word puss is attested in English as early as 1533. Earlier etymology is uncertain, but similar words exist in other European languages, including Lithuanian puižė and Irish puisín, both traditional calls to attract a cat.

The words puss and derived forms pussy and pusscat were extended to refer to girls or women by the seventeenth century. This sense of pussy was used to refer specifically to genitalia by the eighteenth century, and from there further extended to refer to sexual intercourse involving a woman by the twentieth century.

Noah Webster, in his original 1828 American Dictionary of the English Language, defined pussy as: "inflated, swelled; hence, fat, short and thick; and as persons of this make labor in respiration, the word is used for short breathed". He gave pursy as a "corrupt orthography" or misspelling of pussy. In 1913, however, Webster's Revised Unabridged Dictionary reversed the original, suggesting that pussy was a "colloquial or low" variant of pursy. That word, in turn, was defined as "fat and short-breathed", with etymology from Old French pousser "to push". In the Northern English variant of British English, the  dialect form pursy, now rare or obsolete, means "fat" or "short-winded".

The Webster's Third International Dictionary points out similarities between pussy in the sense of "vulva" and Low German or Scandinavian words meaning "pocket" or "purse", including Old Norse pūss and Old English pusa.

The medieval French word pucelle, meaning "maiden" or "virgin", is not related to the English word. It is attested in Old French from the ninth century, and likely derives from Latin. The precise Latin source is disputed, with either puella "girl" or pulla "pullet, young female chicken" suggested as earlier sources.

As a homograph, pussy also has the meaning "containing pus"; with this meaning, the word is pronounced , while the other forms are all pronounced . 

Meanings of the verb relate to the common noun senses, including "to act like a cat", "to act like a coward", or "to have sex with a woman".  Adjective meanings are likewise related to the noun.

Uses

Cat and similar

Both in English and in German puss was used as a "call-name" for cats, but in English pussy was used as a synonym for the word cat in other uses as well. In addition to cats, the word was also used for rabbits and hares. In the 19th century,  the meaning was extended to anything soft and furry. Pussy willow, for example, is a name applied to various species in the genus Salix with furry catkins. In thieves' cant the word pussy means a "fur coat".

The Oxford English Dictionary gives as the first meaning of the noun: "Chiefly colloq[uial]. A girl or woman exhibiting characteristics associated with a cat, esp[ecially] sweetness or amiability. Freq[uently] used as a pet name or as a term of endearment." The examples it cites from the mid-19th to mid-20th centuries are not sexual. Another example, not cited by the OED, is one of the main characters of E. Nesbit's Five Children and It - Jane, nicknamed Pussy by her siblings.

The verb pussyfoot, meaning to walk softly or to speak in an evasive or cautious manner, may come from the adjective pussy-footed "having a cat-like foot", or directly from the noun pussyfoot. This word, first attested in the late nineteenth century, is related to both the "cat" and the "woman" meanings of pussy.

Female genitalia

In contemporary English, use of the word pussy to refer to women themselves is considered derogatory and demeaning, treating people as sexual objects. As a reference to genitals or to sexual intercourse, the word is considered vulgar slang. Studies find the word is used more commonly in conversations among men than in groups of women or mixed-gender groups, though subjects report using pussy more often than other slang terms for female genitals. There are women seeking to reclaim the word to symbolise sexual pleasure, power, and trust in their bodies (e.g. around childbirth).

Donald Trump's use of the word to describe celebrity interactions with women ("grab them by the pussy", known as the Access Hollywood tape) provoked strong reactions by media figures and politicians across the political spectrum; an image of a snarling cat with the slogan "pussy grabs back" became a "rallying cry for female rage against Trump". Pink "pussyhats" (knitted caps with cat-like ears) were a notable feature of the worldwide protests held the day after Trump's inauguration as President of the United States. The name attempts to reclaim the derogatory term and was never intended to be an anatomical representation.

Words referring to cats are used as vulgar slang for female genitals in some other European languages as well. Examples include German Muschi (literally "house cat"), French chatte ("female cat", also used to refer to sexual intercourse), and Dutch poes ("puss"). The Portuguese term rata (literally "female rat") and Norwegian mus ("mouse") are also animal terms used as vulgar slang for women's genitals.

Weakness 

The word pussy is also used in a derogatory sense to mean cowardly, weak, or easily fatigued. The Collins Dictionary says: taboo, slang, mainly US) an ineffectual or timid person." It may refer to a male who is not considered sufficiently masculine, as in: "The coach calls us pussies."

Men who are dominated by women (particularly by their partners or spouses and at one time referred to as "hen-pecked"; see pecking order) can be referred to as pussy-whipped (or simply whipped in slightly more polite society or media). This may be used simply to denigrate a man who is contented in a relationship. The hyphenated phrase is parsed as "whipped by pussy", a manipulative relationship dynamic wherein a female deliberately or subconsciously withholds sexual intercourse to coerce the male into surrendering power in other aspects of the relationship. The male's weakness is his desire for access to female genitalia, and his willingness to weaken his position in the relationship to obtain that access, combining two uses of the word pussy.

Word-play between meanings 

Pussy is one of a large number of English words that has both erotic and non-erotic meanings. Such double entendres have long been used in the creation of sexual humor. This double meaning of "pussy" has been used for over a hundred years by performers, including the late-19th-century vaudeville act the Barrison Sisters, who performed the notorious routine "Do You Want To See My Pussy?" in which they raised their skirts to reveal live kittens.

In the British comedy Are You Being Served? the character Mrs. Slocombe often expressed concern for the welfare of her pussy. The double entendre made every reference to her cat seem to be a salacious and therefore humorous reference to her vulva.

In the 2002 film 8 Mile, a rapper insults his rivals by including the line, "How can six dicks be pussies?" The line relies on double meanings of both dick (either "contemptible person" or "male genitalia") and pussy ("weak" or "female genitalia"). Such word play presents a challenge for translators of the film.

Pussy Riot is a Russian radical feminist punk rock collective that stages illegal events in Moscow protesting President Vladimir Putin and the status of women in Russian society. Band member "Kot" says that she knows how the word is used in English, and that it is also used in Russian as term of endearment for little girls. These various meanings create a tension with the word "riot", which the group likes.

In 2017 Planned Parenthood released a series of short videos on YouTube about female sexual health, with the overall title "How to take care of your pussy". Instead of the word "pussy" being shown or spoken, a cat appears instead. The visuals consist mainly of cats, playing on the popularity of cat videos, with a voiceover by Sasheer Zamata. Refinery29 called it "a pretty genius metaphor" and Metro said: "If there are two things left in this world that are inherently wonderful, it’s cats and vaginas. Don’t argue. It’s true.[...] It makes sense, then, that Planned Parenthood has decided to combine the two to create a truly splendid video series." The series has been shortlisted for a Shorty Award.

See also
 Cunt, another old vulgarism for the vulva
 -ussy, a derivative suffix

References

External links

 Don't be so beastly! by Justine Hankins. The Guardian, June 14, 2003.
 

Sexual slang
English words
Cats
Puns
Etymologies
English profanity
Vulva
Pejorative terms for people